Alejandro Manuel Marque Porto (born 23 October 1981 in Pontevedra) is a Spanish cyclist, who currently rides for UCI Continental team .

Career
Marque was in fine form at the 2013 Volta a Portugal, winning the ninth stage, a  individual time trial, before winning the race overall. However, Marque tested positive for betamethasone during the race. Marque claimed that the UCI had known about the use of the substance as he had used in the days leading up to the race to treat a bad knee.

Major results

2006
 9th Overall Vuelta a Extremadura
2007
 10th Overall Volta ao Distrito de Santarém
2008
 8th Overall Volta ao Alentejo
2009
 1st Stage 4 Grande Prémio Crédito Agrícola de Costa Azul
 7th Overall Volta ao Alentejo
 8th Overall Troféu Joaquim Agostinho
 9th Overall Volta ao Algarve
2010
 2nd Overall Volta ao Alentejo
2011
 3rd Overall Troféu Joaquim Agostinho
 10th Overall Vuelta a Asturias
2012
 1st Stage 9 (ITT) Volta a Portugal
 3rd Time trial, National Road Championships
 5th Overall Vuelta a Asturias
1st Stage 1
2013
 1st Overall Volta a Portugal
1st Stage 9 (ITT)
 3rd Overall Volta ao Alentejo
2015
 3rd Overall Volta a Portugal
 9th Overall Vuelta a Castilla y León
2017
 5th Overall Vuelta a Asturias
 5th Overall Volta a Portugal
2018
 1st Overall Tour of China II
 7th Overall Tour of China I
2019
 7th Overall Volta ao Alentejo
 8th Overall Troféu Joaquim Agostinho
2020
 8th Overall Volta a Portugal
2021
 3rd Overall Volta a Portugal
1st Stage 3

References

External links

1981 births
Living people
Spanish male cyclists
Volta a Portugal winners
Sportspeople from Pontevedra
Cyclists from Galicia (Spain)